Mereşti may refer to:

 Mereşti, a commune in Harghita County, Romania
 Mereşti, a village in Vultureşti Commune, Suceava County, Romania
 Merești River, a tributary of the Homorodul Mic River in Romania

See also 
 Măru (disambiguation)
 Merișor (disambiguation)
 Merișoru (disambiguation)
 Merișani (disambiguation)